The 5th World Science Fiction Convention (Worldcon), also known as Philcon I, was held on 30 August–1 September 1947 at the Penn-Sheraton Hotel in Philadelphia, Pennsylvania, United States.

The chairman was Milton Rothman.

Participants 

Attendance was approximately 200.

Guests of Honor 

 John W. Campbell, Jr.
 L. Jerome Stanton (toastmaster)

See also 

 Hugo Award
 Science fiction
 Speculative fiction
 World Science Fiction Society
 Worldcon

References 

1947 conferences
1947 in Pennsylvania
1947 in the United States
Science fiction conventions in the United States
Worldcon